Dead Bands Party: A Tribute to Oingo Boingo is a tribute album by various artists to the band Oingo Boingo.

Track listing
(all songs written by Danny Elfman, with the exception of 'Violent Love', originally written by Willie Dixon, uncredited on this album)
 "Dead Man's Party" (Clear Static) – 4:14
 "Only a Lad" (Let Go) – 3:22
 "Violent Love" (The Matches and Zebrahead) – 2:35
 "Little Girls" (The Rocky Raccoons) – 3:23
 "We Close Our Eyes" (Reel Big Fish) – 3:52
 "Grey Matter" (Rx Bandits) – 6:26
 "Weird Science" (Hellogoodbye) – 2:27
 "Better Luck Next Time" (Plain White T's) – 3:26
 "Just Another Day" (Stairwell) – 5:34
 "On the Outside" (Suburban Legends) – 3:59
 "Stay" (Over It) – 3:27
 "The Controller" (The Aquabats) – 3:32
 "Not My Slave" (Jessica Burgan) – 3:45
 "When the Lights Go Out" (Finch) – 5:10

References 

Tribute albums
2005 compilation albums